Ping Shan Leng Yan is a classic novel of the caizi jiaren genre written in 1658 in early Qing dynasty China. The title of the book is derived from the surnames of the two couples featured in the book. The novel is sometimes attributed to Di An Shanren, but the authorship is uncertain. It is often attributed to Tianhua Zang Zhuren, a pseudonym meaning "Master of the Heavenly Flower Sutra". Yu jiao li and Ping Shan Leng Yan were both written by the same Tianhua Zang Zhuren according to a style analysis by caizi jiaren scholar Qing Ping Wang. Classical Chinese scholar and Yale professor Chloë Starr lists Ping Shan Leng Yan along with Yu jiao li and Haoqiu zhuan as one of the three best-known examples of the caizi jiaren genre.

Plot
Miss Shan Dai, a beauty, is so talented that she passes the challenging tests set by her tutor and impresses her father, an imperial official. Miss Leng Jiangxue, sent from a poor family to be her maid, on the way sees a striking poem written by an impoverished student, Ping Ruheng. Ping is traveling to Songjiang, where he meets the accomplished and handsome scholar, Yan Baihan. The two young men decide to go to Beijing in disguise to find the renowned Shan Dai, but while they are en route, other suitors plagiarize their poetry to woo the young ladies. The two young ladies defeat Ping and Yan in a contest to write the best poem, however, and in the end their marriages are approved by the emperor himself.

Pseudo-caizi are foils to the real caizi in caizi jiaren stories. Here, the characters, Song Xin (C: 宋 信, P: Sòng Xìn, W: Sung Hsin) and Dou Guoyi (T: 竇國一, S: 窦国一, P: Dòu Guóyī, W: To Kuo-i), plagiarize poems written by Ping and Yan and pretend to be poets.

See also 

 Iu-kiao-li: or, the Two Fair Cousins, another classic caizi jiaren novel
 Huatu yuan, another caizi jiaren novel of the same period

References

External links 
 Ping Shan Leng Yan - Project Gutenberg e-book (in Chinese)

Qing dynasty novels
17th-century Chinese novels
1658 books
Chinese romance novels